The 12th European Cross Country Championships were held at Tilburg in Netherlands on 11 December 2005. Serhiy Lebid won the men's competition for the sixth time and Lornah Kiplagat won the women's race.

Results

Men individual 9.84 km

Total 90 competitors

Men teams

Total 15 teams

Women individual 6.5 km

Total 74 competitors

Women teams

Total 11 teams

Junior men individual 6.5 km

Total 102 competitors

Junior men teams

Total 17 teams

Junior women individual 4.83 km

Total 82 competitors

Junior women teams

Total 13 teams

References

External links 
 Database containing all results between 1994–2007

European Cross Country Championships
European Cross Country Championships
European Cross Country Championships
Cross country running in the Netherlands
European Cross Country Championships